Valerianella eriocarpa is a plant species in the family Caprifoliaceae.

Sources

References 

eriocarpa
Flora of Malta